Pendurru is a village in Bantumilli mandal, located in the Indian state of Andhra Pradesh.

References 

Villages in Krishna district